Charles Richard Brading (February 19, 1935 – September 30, 2016) was an American pharmacist and politician.

Born in Wapakoneta, Ohio, Brading graduated from Ohio Northern University with a degree in pharmacy. He owned Rhine and Brading Pharmacy in Wapakoneta. He served on the Wapakoneta City Council and was president of the city council. Then, he served as mayor of Wapakoneta from 1988 to 1991. Brading served in the Ohio House of Representatives from 1993 to 2000 and was a Republican. His district consisted of an area circled around Findlay, Ohio. He was succeeded by Mike Gilb.

References

External links
Resolution honoring Charles Brading

1935 births
2016 deaths
Ohio city council members
Mayors of places in Ohio
Republican Party members of the Ohio House of Representatives
People from Wapakoneta, Ohio
Ohio Northern University alumni
Businesspeople from Ohio
American pharmacists
20th-century American businesspeople